Bubba Thornton (born March 9, 1947) was the Texas Longhorns men's track and field coach at the University of Texas at Austin from 1996 to 2013. He is also the former head coach for the USA Track & Field team for the 2008 Beijing Summer Olympics

Thornton graduated from Texas Christian University ("TCU") in 1969 with a bachelor's degree in physical education. He participated in varsity football and track and field at TCU.  After graduating, he was drafted by the Buffalo Bills in the 14th round of the 1969 American Football League draft and started as a rookie wide receiver. He began his coaching career at Keller High School where he served as the athletics director and head football coach from 1977 - 1981.

In 1982, he became head coach of track and field at TCU where he coached 72 NCAA All-Americans and his men's team had five NCAA Top 10 finishes (1983, ’87, ’88, ’89 and ’91) and 11 Top 20 finishes. He also coached the TCU team to 39 major relay titles, including five NCAA 400-meter relay championships (1986, ’87, ’89, ’91 and ’95) and the 1983 1,600-meter relay national title.

In 1996, Thornton was hired as the head coach for the men's track and field team at UT.  In 17 seasons, his team as finished in the top 15 at the NCAA Outdoor Championships 13 times, including finishing in the top five four times. He has coached the UT team to 19 top 10 NCAA finishes and 11 Big 12 conference titles (six indoor, five outdoor) and 1 Southwest Conference outdoor title.

Thornton has also served as a coach in the following capacities: 
 Head coach USA, Men’s Track and Field Team, USA Track & Field - 2008 Beijing Summer Olympic Games
 Head coach USA, World Outdoor Men’s Track and Field, USA Track & Field - 2003 World Championships in Athletics
 Assistant coach USA, Men’s Track and Field Team, USA Track & Field - 2000 Sydney Summer Olympics
 Head coach USA - 1996 World Junior Championships in Athletics

Thornton retired in 2013.  He was Inducted into the Texas Track and Field Coaches Hall of Fame, Class of 2015.

See also 

Texas Longhorns Track and Field
2008 Summer Olympics
TCU Horned Frogs
Buffalo Bills Players
1969 NFL Draft
List of American Football League players

External links 
 Bubba Thornton's UT Profile

References 

1947 births
Living people
Texas Christian University alumni
Athletics (track and field) coaches
Place of birth missing (living people)
TCU Horned Frogs football players
Buffalo Bills players
Texas Longhorns track and field coaches